The ancient Latin name Brigantium may refer to:
 A Coruña, Galicia, Spain
 Betanzos, Galicia, Spain
 Bregenz, Vorarlberg, Austria (Bregenz was called Brigantium by the Romans)
 Briançon, Provence-Alpes-Côte d'Azur, France
 Bragança (Portugal), Alto Trás-os-Montes, Portugal
 Isurium Brigantum, Aldborough, North Yorkshire, England
 Breganze, Veneto, Italia

See also 
 Brigantia (disambiguation)